Robert Leipertz (born 1 February 1993) is a German footballer who plays as a forward for  club SC Paderborn.

Club career
On 3 May 2022, Leipertz signed a two-year contract with SC Paderborn, effective 1 July 2022.

References

External links
 
 

1993 births
People from Jülich
Sportspeople from Cologne (region)
Footballers from North Rhine-Westphalia
Living people
German footballers
Association football forwards
Alemannia Aachen players
FC Schalke 04 II players
1. FC Heidenheim players
FC Ingolstadt 04 players
FC Ingolstadt 04 II players
SC Paderborn 07 players
Bundesliga players
3. Liga players
2. Bundesliga players